Elizabethtown is an unincorporated community in Colfax County, New Mexico, United States. It is located just off New Mexico State Road 38, between the communities of Eagle Nest and Red River. Elizabethtown is just east of the Carson National Forest. The community is a former mining town, and lies northeast of Scully Mountain, and west of Baldy Mountain.

History

Mostly a ghost town now, Elizabethtown began in 1866 with the founding of area gold mines and the Mystic Copper Mine. It was New Mexico's first incorporated town.  Founded by the commander of Fort Union (north of Las Vegas, New Mexico), Captain William H. Moore, and named for his daughter, Elizabeth Catherine Moore. Nicknamed "E-Town," the town grew to over 7000 residents at its height of prosperity in 1870, and it was designated the first seat of the newly formed Colfax County.  In 1872 there were only about 100 residents left as the mines dwindled, and the county seat was moved to Cimarron. The town revived somewhat when the Atchison, Topeka and Santa Fe Railroad passed nearby in the early 1890s, making mining feasible once again. The village was also part of the Colfax County War. A fire took most of the town in 1903, and the town mostly died out by 1917 with the decline in the mines.

Serial killer Charles Kennedy lived between Elizabethtown and Taos, luring weary travelers to dine and stay with him at his cabin; he may have killed 14 or more people. Kennedy was killed by a group of angry vigilantes, led by the notorious Clay Allison.

Geography
Location of Elizabethtown is  (36.619198, -105.28445).

The elevation is 8481 feet (2585 m).

Major highways
 New Mexico State Road 38

See also

References

External links

 Elizabethtown page @ Legends of America
 Elizabethtown picture gallery
 History, photos and museum information

History of Colfax County, New Mexico
Unincorporated communities in New Mexico
Ghost towns in New Mexico
Museums in Colfax County, New Mexico
History museums in New Mexico
Unincorporated communities in Colfax County, New Mexico
Populated places established in 1866
1866 establishments in New Mexico Territory